Dour is a municipality of Wallonia located in the province of Hainaut, Belgium.

On 1 January 2006 the municipality had 16,810 inhabitants. The total area is 33.32 km2, giving a population density of 505 inhabitants per km2.

The municipality consists of the following districts: Blaugies, Dour, Élouges, and Wihéries.

Dour is often considered the western end of the sillon industriel, the former industrial backbone of Wallonia.

Since 1989, Dour has hosted the annual Dour Festival, a music festival covering various genres.

See also

References

External links
 

Municipalities of Hainaut (province)